The Passing of Wolf MacLean is a 1924 silent Western film directed by Paul Hurst and produced by and starring Jack Mower.

Plot
As described in a review in a film magazine, Bert Granger (Fenton) gambles, drinks and runs a saloon in which his two children, Benny (Fox) and Alice (Rayford), are the entertainers. The Stranger (Mower) comes along, stops a drinking bout, gets into a fight and is victorious. After that he and Alice become interested in one another. Bert loses his property to card sharps. Young Benny sees a big reward for the arrest of “Wolf MacLean” and, as the Stranger tallies with the description, he arrests him. The old man reforms and makes Benny a partner in a new grocery business. Benny aids the Stranger to escape. The Stranger is just about to be hanged by the card sharks when Parson Williams (Hallett) makes known that he is the criminal and that the sharks are his confederates.

Cast
 Jack Mower as Wolf MacLean, a stranger (credited as Jack Meehan)
 Johnny Fox as Benny Granger (credited as Johnnie Fox)
 Alma Rayford as Alice Granger
 Mark Fenton as Bert Granger
 Al Hallett as Parson Dan Williams

Preservation
With no prints of The Passing of Wolf MacLean located in any film archives, it is a lost film.

References

External links
 
 
 Lobby poster

1924 films
1924 Western (genre) films
1924 lost films
American black-and-white films
Lost American films
Lost Western (genre) films
Silent American Western (genre) films
Films directed by Paul Hurst
1920s American films